MINSA FBC (sometimes referred as MINSA) is a Peruvian football club, playing in the province of Tambopata, Madre de Dios, Peru.

History

The MINSA FBC was founded on August 6, 1996.

In 2013 Copa Perú, the club classified to the National Stage, but was eliminated in the Group Stage.

In 2014 Copa Perú, the club classified to the National Stage, but was eliminated in the Group Stage.

In 2015 Copa Perú, the club classified to the National Stage, but was eliminated by Juventud Barrio Nuevo in the Repechage.

In 2016 Copa Perú, the club classified to the National Stage, but was eliminated by Credicoop San Román in the Repechage.

In 2017 Copa Perú, the club classified to the National Stage, but was eliminated when it finished in 43rd place.

In 2018 Copa Perú, the club classified to the National Stage, but was eliminated when it finished in 42nd place.

Honours

Regional
Liga Departamental de Madre de Dios:
Winners (8): 2006, 2007, 2009, 2011, 2012, 2014, 2015, 2016
Runner-up (5): 2008, 2010, 2013, 2017, 2018

 Liga Provincial de Tambopata:
Winners (7): 2009, 2010, 2014, 2015, 2016, 2018
Runner-up (2): 2011, 2017

 Liga Distrital de Tambopata:
Winners (2): 2015, 2018
Runner-up (5): 2010, 2011, 2014, 2016, 2017

See also
List of football clubs in Peru
Peruvian football league system

References

External links
 

Football clubs in Peru
Association football clubs established in 1996
1996 establishments in Peru